"Cinnamon" is a song by American rock band Stone Temple Pilots. "Cinnamon" is the sixth track off the band's sixth studio album, Stone Temple Pilots, released in 2010. The song was the album's third single, after "Take a Load Off". Two music videos were filmed for "Cinnamon," however neither one was officially released but can be viewed on YouTube. This was also the band's final single recorded with their full original lineup with their original vocalist Scott Weiland before he was fired from the band in 2013 and before his death in December 2015.

Composition
Lead singer, Scott Weiland, considered "Cinnamon" to be a combination of '60s British pop and Ian Curtis (of Joy Division). Weiland's lyrics were directly influenced by his relationship with his ex-wife.

References

Stone Temple Pilots songs
2010 songs
2010 singles
Song recordings produced by Don Was
Songs written by Robert DeLeo
Songs written by Scott Weiland
Atlantic Records singles